The canton of Plonéour-Lanvern is an administrative division of the Finistère department, northwestern France. It was created at the French canton reorganisation which came into effect in March 2015. Its seat is in Plonéour-Lanvern.

It consists of the following communes:
 
Combrit
Gourlizon
Guiler-sur-Goyen
Île-Tudy
Landudec
Peumerit
Plogastel-Saint-Germain
Plomeur
Plonéour-Lanvern
Plovan
Plozévet
Pouldreuzic
Saint-Jean-Trolimon
Tréguennec
Tréméoc
Tréogat

References

Cantons of Finistère